Carol Lynley (born Carole Ann Jones; February 13, 1942 – September 3, 2019) was an American actress and child model. She is known for her roles in the films The Poseidon Adventure (1972) and Blue Denim.

Lynley was born Carole Ann Jones in Manhattan, to an Irish father and New England mother. She began her career at the age of 15 as a child model appearing on the April 22, 1957, cover of Life. She won the Theatre World Award as "one of the most promising personalities for 1956-57" for her performance in The Potting Shed. She started her film career in 1958 with the Disney's film The Light in the Forest followed by Holiday for Lovers (1959) and Blue Denim (1959). In 1959, Lynley was nominated for the Golden Globe Award for Most Promising Newcomer – Female for the film The Light in the Forest. In 1960 she was again nominated for the Golden Globe Award for Most Promising Newcomer – Female for the film Blue Denim.

Filmography

Film

Television

References

External links
 
 Carol Lynley at Allmovie
 Carol Lynley (Aveleyman)

Actress filmographies
American filmographies